Anhar-e Sofla (also Romanized as Anhar-e Soflá; also known as Anhar) is a village in Rowzeh Chay Rural District, in the Central District of Urmia County, West Azerbaijan Province, Iran. At the 2006 census, its population was 765, in 147 families. 

Prior to the Assyrian genocide, the village was exclusively inhabited by Assyrians. It is known for its ancient church of Mart Maryam and its festival of Mar Gawra (shara d'Mar Gawra).

See also
 Assyrians in Iran
 List of Assyrian settlements

References 

Populated places in Urmia County

Assyrian settlements